The 1989 Eagle Tournament of Champions was a men's tennis tournament played on outdoor clay courts at the West Side Tennis Club in Forest Hills, New York in the United States and was part of World Championship Tennis and the 1989 Nabisco Grand Prix. It was the 13th edition of the tournament and took place from May 1 through May 7, 1989. First-seeded Ivan Lendl won the singles title.

Finals

Singles

 Ivan Lendl defeated  Jaime Yzaga 6–2, 6–1
 It was Lendl's 4th singles title of the year and the 77th of his career.

Doubles

 Rick Leach /  Jim Pugh defeated  Jim Courier /  Pete Sampras 6–4, 6–2
 It was Leach's 4th title of the year and the 14th of his career. It was Pugh's 4th title of the year and the 14th of his career.

References

External links
 International Tennis Federation – tournament edition details

Eagle Tournament of Champions
World Championship Tennis Tournament of Champions
Eagle Tournament of Champions
Eagle Tournament of Champions
Eagle Tournament of Champions